NetworkManager is a daemon that sits on top of libudev and other Linux kernel interfaces (and a couple of other daemons) and provides a high-level interface for the configuration of the network interfaces.

Rationale
NetworkManager is a software utility that aims to simplify the use of computer networks.
NetworkManager is available for Linux kernel-based and other Unix-like operating systems.

How it works

To connect computers with each other, various communications protocols have been developed, e.g. IEEE 802.3 (Ethernet), IEEE 802.11 ("wireless"), IEEE 802.15.1 (Bluetooth), PPPoE, PPPoA, and many many more. Each participating computer must have the suitable hardware, e.g. network card or wireless network card and this hardware must be configured accordingly to be able to establish a connection.

In case of a monolithic kernel all the device drivers are part of it. The hardware is accessed (and also configured) through its device driver. In case of Linux, the kernel presents for each device driver a representation in form of a device file. All device files are found in the /dev directory, and traditionally the device files for Ethernet hardware have been named eth0, eth1, etc. Since systemd, they are named differently: enp4s0, etc. (This abstraction is called the everything is a file concept.)

Anything in user-space accesses the hardware through its device file. The configuration utility to configure the hardware, and programs like the web browser/SSH/NTP-client/etc. to send and receive network packets.

Configuration of network interfaces without NetworkManager
On Linux and all Unix-like operating systems, the utilities ifconfig and the newer ip (from the iproute2-bundle) are used to configure IEEE 802.3 and IEEE 802.11 hardware. These utilities configure the kernel directly and the configuration is applied immediately. After boot-up, the user is required to configure them again.

To apply the same static configuration after each boot-up, the PID1-programs are used: System V init executes shell scripts and binary programs, systemd parses its own conf-files (and executes programs). The boot-up configuration for network interfaces is stored in /etc/network/interfaces for Debian Linux distributions and its derivatives or ifcfg files in /etc/sysconfig/network-scripts/ for Fedora and its derivatives, and DNS-servers in /etc/resolv.conf. /etc/network/interfaces or /etc/sysconfig/network-scripts/ifcfg-* can define a static IP-address or dhclient to be used, and all kinds of VPN can be configured here as well.

In case the configuration has to be changed, DHCP-protocol goes a long way to do so automatically, without the user even noticing.

Configuration of network interfaces with NetworkManager
 NetworkManager is accessible via dbus.
 Configuration is stored in /etc/NetworkManager/NetworkManager.conf

But as we've transitioned from physically large servers to more portable hosts that may be plugged and unplugged (or moved from WiFi hotspot to WiFi hotspot) at the user's discretion, dynamic configurations (i.e., not stored in a static configuration file but taken from outside the host, and potentially changing after boot) have become a more prevalent configuration. Bootp was an early protocol used for this, and to this day its descendant DHCP is still very common. Many Unix-like systems include a program called dhclient to handle this dynamic configuration. Given a relatively static or simple dynamic configuration, static configuration modified by dhclient works well. However, as networks and their topologies get more complex, a central manager for all the network configuration information becomes more essential.

Software architecture
NetworkManager has two components:
 the NetworkManager daemon, the actual software which manages connections and reports network changes
 several graphical front-ends for diverse graphical desktop environments, such as GNOME Shell, GNOME Panel, KDE Plasma Workspaces, Cinnamon, etc.

Both components are intended by the developers to be reasonably portable, and the applet is available to desktop environments which implement the Freedesktop.org System Tray Protocol, including GNOME, KDE Plasma Workspaces, Enlightenment (software) and Xfce. As the components communicate via D-Bus, applications can be written to be “link-aware”, or to replace the provided applet entirely. One example is KNetworkManager, a KDE frontend to NetworkManager developed by Novell for SUSE Linux.

Graphical front-ends and command line interfaces

nm-applet
nm-applet is the GNOME applet for NetworkManager.
nmcli
nmcli is NetworkManager's built-in command-line interface added in 2010. nmcli allows easy display of NetworkManager's current status, manage connections and devices, monitor connections.
nmtui
nmtui is a built-in text-based user interface. nmtui is relatively basic compared to nmcli, which only allows users to add/edit a connection, activate a connection, and set the hostname of the system.
cnetworkmanager
cnetworkmanager command-line interface for NetworkManager.

Mobile broadband configuration assistant
Antti Kaijanmäki announced the development of a mobile broadband configuration assistant for NetworkManager in April 2008; it became available in NetworkManager version 0.7.0. Together with the package mobile-broadband-provider-info the connection is easily configured.

History
Red Hat initiated the NetworkManager project in 2004 with the goal of enabling Linux users to deal more easily with modern networking needs, particularly wireless networking. NetworkManager takes an opportunistic approach to network selection, attempting to use the best available connection as outages occur, or as the user roams between wireless networks. It prefers Ethernet connections over “known” wireless networks, which are preferred over wireless networks with SSIDs to which the user has never connected. The user is prompted for WEP or WPA keys as needed.

The NetworkManager project was among the first major Linux desktop components to utilize D-Bus and HAL extensively. Since June 2009, however, NetworkManager no longer depends on HAL, and since 0.9.10 (ca. 2014), neither does it require the D-Bus daemon to be running for root operation.

See also

 Linux on the desktop
 BlueZ
 GNOME Keyring Manager
 usbserial
 Wicd – network manager written in Python
 wpa_supplicant
 wvdial
 netifd – tiny daemon with the ability to listen on netlink events; does not require D-Bus, does not depend on GLib, targets embedded devices
 ConnMan – daemon for managing Internet connections within embedded devices

References

External links
 NetworkManager Homepage
 Service Provider Database
 NetworkManager in freedesktop.org
 NetworkManager status on the freebsd-gnome mailing list
 Original NetworkManager page at redhat.com via WaybackMachine
 Announcement of the first public release of NetworkManager
 How to use a WiFi interface with NetworkManager

Applications using D-Bus
Free network-related software
Linux network-related software
Red Hat software